Qanat Sir (also Romanized as Qanāt Sīr and Qanat-i-Sir; also known as Ghanat Sir and Kahn-e Sīr) is a village in Mashiz Rural District, in the Central District of Bardsir County, Kerman Province, Iran. At the 2006 census, its population was 462, in 102 families.

References 

Populated places in Bardsir County